First Admiral (Rtd) Mohamad Imran bin Abdul Hamid (Jawi: محمد عمران بن عبدالحميد) is a Malaysian politician. He is a member of the People's Justice Party (PKR), a component party of Pakatan Harapan (PH) coalition.

Imran was the Member of Parliament (MP) for Lumut for one term from 2013 to 2018 after winning the parliamentary seat in the 2013 general election. He contested the Perak State Legislative Assembly seat of Bukit Chandan instead in the 2018 general election but lost. Later he was appointed as a Senator in the Upper House Dewan Negara of the Parliament of Malaysia for the term 27 August 2018 to 26 August 2021.

Controversy
In 2019, Imran had proposed a sexual harassment law to 'protect men' from being seduced into committing sexual crimes and to 'ensure men are safe and the country is peaceful', during the debate on Syarie Legal Profession (Federal Territories) Bill 2019 at the Dewan Negara. He immediately received a lot of protest from many who were upset with his disgusting unthoughtful and insensitive suggestion including his own party, PKR's president, Anwar Ibrahim who ask him to retract his proposal. He apologised 'a million times' for his big mistake that hurts the feelings of many women and also insulted the men and retract his proposal on the next day.

Election results

Honours
  :
  Officer of the Order of the Defender of the Realm (KMN) (1995)

See also
Lumut (federal constituency)
List of people who have served in both Houses of the Malaysian Parliament

References

Living people
Date of birth missing (living people)
1954 births
Malaysian people of Malay descent
Malaysian Muslims
Malaysian military personnel
People's Justice Party (Malaysia) politicians
Members of the Dewan Rakyat
Members of the Dewan Negara
21st-century Malaysian politicians
Officers of the Order of the Defender of the Realm